Gyratrix is a genus of flatworms belonging to the family Polycystididae.

The genus has cosmopolitan distribution.

Species:
 Gyratrix hermaphroditus Ehrenberg, 1831 
 Gyratrix proaviformis Karling & Schockaert, 1977

References

Rhabdocoela
Platyhelminthes genera